Return flow is surface and subsurface water that leaves the field following application of irrigation water. While irrigation return flows are point sources, in the United States they are expressly exempted from discharge permit requirements under the Clean Water Act.

Return flows generally return to the irrigation centre after a period of about three to four weeks; due to this, the farmers usually need to pour bleach into the water to clean it of any organisms that have entered the stream. If this is not taken care of, diseases such as typhoid or cholera could enter the irrigation and pose a risk of epidemic disease to surrounding towns and cities.

The return flows in irrigation is nearly 50% of the water supplied in silty clay soil type in tropical countries. The salinity of the return flow water increases with decrease in % of return flow quantity. Rest of the water supplied to irrigation evaporates to atmosphere due to evapotranspiration.

When ground water is extracted for irrigation and other uses, most of the return flows seep back into the ground instead of joining the nearby surface stream. When ground water is used in excess of recharge from rainfall/precipitation, the quality of groundwater deteriorates over a period of time and becomes unfit for irrigation use.

References 

 

United States Department of Agriculture
Water law
Water pollution